Makran, mentioned in some sources as Mecran and Mokrān, is the coastal region of Baluchistan. It is a semi-desert coastal strip in Balochistan, in Pakistan and Iran, along the coast of the Gulf of Oman. It extends westwards, from the Sonmiani Bay to the northwest of Karachi in the east, to the fringes of the region of Bashkardia/Bāšgerd in the southern part of the Sistān and Balučestān province of modern Iran. Makrān is thus bisected by the modern political boundary between Pakistan and Iran.

Etymology
The southern part of Balochistan is called Kech Makran on Pakistani side and Makran on the Iranian side which is also the name of a former Iranian province. The location corresponds to that of the Maka satrapy in Achaemenid times. The Sumerian trading partners of Magan are identified with Makran. In Varahamihira's Brihat Samhita, there is a mention of a tribe called Makara inhabiting the lands west of India. Arrian used the term Ichthyophagi (Ancient Greek for "fish eaters") for inhabitants of coastal areas, which has led to a suggestion to derive Makran from the modern Persian term māhī khorān, meaning "fish eaters".

History

Earliest settlements 
The Kech-Makran region in southwestern Pakistan, along Kech River, was inhabited as early as the 5th millennium BC. The site of Miri Qalat was investigated by French and Pakistani archaeologists from 1987 to 2007. Later, the site of Shahi-Tump, near Turbat, was also studied.

Large and massive quadrangular stone building were constructed already before 4000 BC. Flints, worked
stones, and bone tools used by the inhabitants were found by archaeologists, but no ceramics were yet used.

In this Period I the inhabitants of the Kech River Valley already cultivated wheat and barley, as well as lentils. They had domesticated cattle, goats, and sheep. They also caught fish from the Oman Sea.

During Period II, the building of massive architectural structures continued, and a quadrangular stone complex was built. Later, mud brick constructions also appear on top of some of these stone buildings.

At Miri Qalat, some links with Uruk culture ceramics were also found.

The related site of Balakot, Makran, going back to 4000 BC, was also studied by archaeologists.

Ancient times
After the victory of the Mauryan Empire against the Greeks in the Seleucid–Mauryan war, Baluchistan came under the rule of Chandragupta Maurya of ancient India. Chandragupta and Seleucus made a peace settlement in 304 BC. Seleucus I Nicator ceded the satrapies, including those in Baluchistan to the expanding Mauryan Empire. The alliance was solidified with a marriage between Chandragupta Maurya and a princess of the Seleucid Empire. The outcome of the arrangement proved to be mutually beneficial. The border between the Seleucid and Mauryan Empires remained stable in subsequent generations, and friendly diplomatic relations are reflected by the ambassador Megasthenes, and by the envoys sent westward by Chandragupta's grandson Ashoka.

Sasanian Empire
Shapur I's trilingual inscription at the Ka'ba-ye Zartosht in Naqsh-i-Rustam, dated to 262 CE, had noted "Makuran"/"Makran" to be one of the many provinces of the Sasanian Empire:

Buddhist and Hindu past
Abū Rayḥān Muḥammad ibn Aḥmad Al-Bīrūnī states in his book Alberuni's India that the coast of India begins with Tiz, the capital of Makran.

According to historian Andre Wink:

Wink has recorded Hiuen Tsang's notes on the language and script in use in easternmost Makran (eastern parts of Pakistani Balochistan and Sindh):

Early Medieval times
The Hindu Sewa Dynasty ruled much of Baluchistan up until the 7th century AD. The Sibi division carved out of Quetta division still derives its name from Rani Sewi, the queen of the Hindu Sewa dynasty.

In 635 or 636 CE, the Hindu Brahman dynasty of Sindh controlled parts of Balochistan.

Islamic conquest

The first Islamic conquest of Makran took place during the Rashidun Caliphate in the year 643 A.D. Caliph Umar’s governor of Bahrain, Usman ibn Abu al-Aas, who was on a campaign to conquer the southern coastal areas beyond Sassanid, sent his brother Hakam ibn Abu al-Aas to raid and reconnoitre the Makran region.

In late 644 AD Caliph Umar dispatched an army under the command of Hakam ibn Amr for the wholesale invasion of Makkuran. He was joined by reinforcements from Kufa under the command of Shahab ibn Makharaq, and by Abdullah ibn Utban, the commander of a campaign in Kerman. They encountered no strong resistance in Makran until the army of the King of Rai, along with contingents from Makran and Sind, stopped them near the Indus River. In mid-644 the Battle of Rasil was fought between the forces of the Rashidun Caliphate and the Rai Kingdom; the Raja's forces were defeated and forced to retreat to the eastern bank of the Indus. The Raja’s army had included war elephants, but these had posed little problem for the Muslim invaders, who had dealt with them during the conquest of Persia. In accordance with the orders of Caliph Umar, the captured war elephants were sold in Islamic Persia, with the proceeds distributed among the soldiers as share in booty. In response to Caliph Umar’s questions about the Makran region, the messenger from Makkuran who brought the news of the victory told him:

Umar looked at the messenger and said: 
"Are you a messenger or a poet?" He replied, "Messenger". 
Thereupon Caliph Umar instructed Hakim bin Amr al Taghlabi that for the time being Makkuran should be the easternmost frontier of the Islamic empire, and that no further attempt should be made to extend the conquests.

It was reconquered by the usurper Chach of Alor in 631. Ten years later, it was described to be "under the government of Persia" by Xuanzang who visited the region. Three years later however, when the Arabs invaded, it was regarded as the "frontier of Al-Hind". the Brahmin King of Sindh, Maharaja Chacha met the invaders outside Broach and defeated them with heavy slaughter also killing their very Commander-in-Chief Abdul Aziz in the process .

Baloch attack on Mahmud Ghazni
Baloch raiders plundered Mahmud of Ghazni's ambassador between Tabbas and Khabis. In revenge, his son Masud defeated them at the latter place, which lies at the foot of the Karman Mountains on the edge of the desert.

Modern era

From the 15th century onward, the area was ruled by the Rind, Buledai, and Gichki. The western part of Makran, now Iranian area of Sarbaz and Dashtiyari  ruled by Barakzai (Baranzai) and Sardarzai.In the late 18th century, the Khan of Kalat is said to have granted sanctuary at Gwadar to one of the claimants for the throne of Muscat. When that claimant became Sultan, he kept hold of Gwadar, installing a governor, who eventually led an army to conquer the city of Chabahar some 200 kilometres to the west.

The sultanate held onto the Makran coast throughout the period of British colonial rule, but eventually, only Gwadar was left in the hands of the sultan. On the independence of Pakistan, Makran became a district within the province of Balochistan, with the exception of an area of 800 km2 around Gwadar. In 1958 the Gwadar enclave was transferred to Pakistani control as part of the district of Makran. The entire region has been subdivided into new smaller districts over the years.

Geography

The narrow coastal plain rises rapidly into several mountain ranges. The climate is dry with little rainfall. Makran is very sparsely inhabited, with much of the population concentrated in a string of small ports including Chabahar, Gwatar, Jiwani, Jask, Sirik, Gwadar (not to be confused with Gwatar), Pasni, Ormara and many smaller fishing villages.

There is only one island off the coast of Makran, Astola Island, near Pasni although there are several small islets. The coastline can be divided into an eastern lagoon coastline and a western embayed coastline. The main lagoons are Miani Hor and Kalamat Hor. The main bays of the embayed coast are Gwadar Bay and Gwatar Bay. This latter bay shelters a large mangrove forest and the nesting grounds of endangered turtle species. The Mirani Dam provides irrigation, flood prevention and water supply to Gwadar city.

See also
 Chabahar
 Gwadar
 Khor Kalmat
 Lyari Town
 Makran Coastal Highway
 Makran Coastal Range
 Makran Division
 N'aschi
 Sokhta Koh
 State of Makran
 Wildlife of Pakistan § Western highlands, plains and deserts
 1945 Balochistan earthquake

References

Bibliography

 Nicolini, Beatrice, The Makran-Baluch-African Network in Zanzibar and East Africa during the XIXth Century, African and Asian Studies, Volume 5, Numbers 3–4, 2006, pp. 347–370(24)
Al-Hind: Early Medieval India and the Expansion of Islam 7Th-11th 
 Eilers, Wilhelm, Das Volk der Makā vor und nach den Achämeniden, AMI Ergänzungsband 10, 1983, 101–119

External links

 Balochistan and Makran, Pakistan
 'Music of Makran: traditional fusion from coastal Balochistan' from the British Library Sound Archive
 

Gulf of Oman
Plains of Iran
Plains of Pakistan
Regions of Pakistan
Historical regions of Iran
Historical regions of Pakistan
Sistan and Baluchestan Province
History of Balochistan
Landforms of Balochistan (Pakistan)
Divided regions
Deserts of Pakistan